A list of fantasy films released in the 1930s.

List

1930s
Fantasy